Cacia yunnana is a species of beetle in the family Cerambycidae. It was described by Stephan von Breuning in 1938. It is known from China.

References

Cacia (beetle)
Beetles described in 1938